The 1993 Men's Hockey Champions Trophy was the 15th edition of the Hockey Champions Trophy men's field hockey tournament.

For the second time in the history the annual six nations tournament ended with play-offs, in which the numbers one and two from the round robin faced each other in the final. The numbers three and four played the bronze medal game, while the numbers five and six tried to avoid relegation in their fifth and sixth place match.

Results

Pool

Classification

Fifth and sixth place

Third and fourth place

Final

Final standings

References

External links
Official FIH website

C
F
1993
Champions Trophy (field hockey)